Geranium tuberosum, the tuberous-rooted cranesbill, is a species of flowering plant in the family Geraniaceae. It is native to the Mediterranean region, the Caucasus, and western Asia. The Royal Horticultural Society considers it a good plant to attract pollinators, and it is widely available from commercial suppliers. There are a number of cultivars available, including 'Rosie's Mauve' and 'Richard Hobbs'.

References

tuberosum
Garden plants
Flora of Algeria
Flora of Tunisia
Flora of Libya
Flora of France
Flora of Southeastern Europe
Flora of South European Russia
Flora of the Crimean Peninsula
Flora of the Caucasus
Flora of Western Asia
Flora of Turkmenistan
Taxa named by Carl Linnaeus
Plants described in 1753